NAL or Nal may refer to:

In organizations:
 Nal Sarovar Bird Sanctuary, in India
 National Aerospace Laboratories, India
 National Aerospace Laboratory of Japan
 National Alliance of Liberals, a political party in Ghana
 United States National Agricultural Library
 New American Library, a publisher
 Nintendo Australia, a publisher and distributor of video games to Oceania

In transportation:
 Nal Airport, in Rajasthan, India
 Nalchik Airport (IATA code)
 Norwegian America Line, a ship line
 Nakanihon Airlines, a Japanese airline that became Air Central
 North Auckland Line, a railway line in New Zealand

In sports:
 National Adult League, a fourth-tier U.S. soccer league
 National Arena League, a professional indoor football league
 Negro American League, a professional baseball Negro league
 North American League (baseball), a professional baseball minor league

In technology:
 Network Abstraction Layer in MPEG video codecs
 Network Access License, a certification for telecommunication equipment for the Chinese market
 Novell Application Launcher, now Novell ZENworks

In other uses:
 Nál or Laufey, a goddess in Norse mythology